Niromar Martins Campos (born 11 November 1953) is a retired Portuguese-Brazilian professional footballer who played as a forward for various clubs, including FC Porto.

He is the father of Portuguese footballer Fábio Martins.

References

External links
 ZeroZero profile

1953 births
Living people
Portuguese footballers
Brazilian footballers
Portuguese people of Brazilian descent
Association football forwards
Primeira Liga players
S.C. Beira-Mar players
FC Porto players
A.D. Sanjoanense players
Portimonense S.C. players
C.F. Estrela da Amadora players
S.C. Covilhã players
A.D. Lousada players
S.C. Campomaiorense players
Footballers from Rio de Janeiro (city)